The 2008 Women's Junior Pan-Am Championship was the 6th edition of the Women's Pan American Junior Championship. It was held from 6 to 12 October 2008 in Mexico City, Mexico.

The tournament served as a qualifier for the 2009 Women's Hockey Junior World Cup, held in Boston, United States in August 2009.

United States won the tournament for the 1st time, defeating Chile 2–1 in the final. Argentina won the bronze medal by defeating Mexico 8–0 in the third and fourth place playoff.

Participating nations
A total of eight teams participated in the tournament:

Results

First round

Pool A

Pool B

Second round

Fifth to eighth place classification

Crossover

Seventh and eighth place

Fifth and sixth place

First to fourth place classification

Semi-finals

Third and fourth place

Final

Awards

Statistics

Final standings
Note: as the United States qualified for the 2009 Junior World Cup as the host nation, Argentina took the remaining entry quota as the next highest ranked team.

Goalscorers

References

Women's Pan-Am Junior Championship
Pan American Junior Championship
International women's field hockey competitions hosted by Mexico
Pan American Junior Championship
Sports competitions in Mexico City
2000s in Mexico City
Pan American Junior Championship
Pan American Championship